The Malaysia Architecture Museum is an architecture museum in Malacca City, Malacca, Malaysia which exhibits various architectural materials, building models and concepts.

The museum's building is Dutch in style, as it was built during the Dutch period in the 18th century as the residence and administration center of the Dutch officials. During the British Malaya period, the building was used as an administrative office. After the independence of Malaya in 1957, the building became the office of Malacca Water Board. In 2000, the building was restored to its original shape by the department of Museum and Antiquities. The museum was opened in 2004 and it is administered under the Antiquity and Museum Association.

The building consists of two floors, which is divided into:
 Ground floor
 Introduction
 Historical Development of Malaysian Architecture
 Architecture and Beliefs
 Upper floor
 The Typology
 Carvings and Motifs
 Tools and Technology
 Materials

See also
 List of museums in Malaysia
 List of tourist attractions in Malacca

References

2004 establishments in Malaysia
Buildings and structures in Malacca City
Museums in Malacca
Museums established in 2004